Alexander Stirling Calder (January 11, 1870 – January 7, 1945) was an American sculptor and teacher. He was the son of sculptor Alexander Milne Calder and the father of sculptor Alexander (Sandy) Calder. His best-known works are George Washington as President on the Washington Square Arch in New York City, the Swann Memorial Fountain in Philadelphia, and the Leif Eriksson Memorial in Reykjavík, Iceland.

Education
A. Stirling Calder was born in Philadelphia, Pennsylvania, the son of sculptor Alexander Milne Calder and Margaret Stirling. He attended city public schools, and enrolled at the Pennsylvania Academy of the Fine Arts in Fall 1885, at age 15. He studied under Thomas Eakins for several months, until the teacher's forced resignation in February 1886. Calder remained at PAFA, studying under Thomas Anshutz and James P. Kelly. Two of his sculptures were accepted for PAFA's 1887 annual exhibition, a rare honor for a student.

His father designed and was then in the midst of executing, the extensive sculpture program for Philadelphia City Hall. Calder worked as an apprentice on the project during the summers, and is reported to have modeled an arm for one of the figures. He made his first trip to Europe in Summer 1889, and returned there to study the following year.

Calder moved to Paris in Fall 1890, where he studied at the Académie Julian under Henri Michel Chapu. The following year, he was accepted at the École des Beaux-Arts, where he entered the atelier of Alexandre Falguière.

Career

In 1892, he returned to Philadelphia and began his career as a sculptor in earnest. His first major commission, won in a national competition, was for a larger-than-life-size statue of Dr. Samuel Gross (1895–97) for the National Mall in Washington, D.C. Calder replicated the pose of Dr. Gross from Eakins's 1875 painting The Gross Clinic. Another early commission was for a set of twelve larger-than-life-size statues of Presbyterian clergymen for the facade of the Witherspoon Building (1898–99) in Philadelphia.

In 1906, he was elected into the National Academy of Design as an Associate member, and became a full member in 1913.

In Pasadena, he modeled architectural sculpture for the Throop Polytechnic Institute (now the California Institute of Technology). He returned to the east coast in 1910.

In 1912, he was named acting-chief (under Karl Bitter) of the sculpture program for the Panama-Pacific Exposition, a World's Fair to open in San Francisco, California, in February 1915. He obtained a studio in NYC and there employed the services of model Audrey Munson who posed for him – Star Maiden (1913–1915) – and a host of other artists. For the exposition, Calder completed three massive sculpture groups, The Nations of the East and The Nations of the West, which crowned triumphal arches, and a fountain group, The Fountain of Energy. Following Bitter's sudden death in April 1915, Calder completed the Depew Memorial Fountain (1915–1919) in Indianapolis, Indiana.

Hermon Atkins MacNeil and Calder were commissioned to create larger-than-life-size sculptures for the Washington Square Arch in New York City. George Washington as Commander-in-Chief, Accompanied by Fame and Valor (1914–1916) was sculpted by MacNeil; and George Washington as President, Accompanied by Wisdom and Justice (1917–18) by Calder. These are sometimes referred to as Washington at War and Washington at Peace.

He sculpted a number of ornamental works for "Vizcaya", the James Deering estate outside Miami, Florida. These included the famous Italian Barge (1917–1919), a stone folly in the shape of a boat, projecting into Biscayne Bay.

Two of his major commissions of the 1920s were the Swann Memorial Fountain (1920–1924) in Logan Circle, and the architectural sculpture program for the University of Pennsylvania Museum of Archaeology and Anthropology (completed 1931), both in Philadelphia.

He was one of a dozen sculptors invited to compete in Oklahoma's Pioneer Woman statue competition in 1926–27, which was won by Bryant Baker. In 1927, he was also commissioned by the Berkshire Museum to sculpt the woodwork and fountain of the Museum's Ellen Crane Memorial Room in Pittsfield, Massachusetts.

In 1929, he won the national competition for a monumental statue of Leif Eriksson, to be the gift of the United States to Iceland in commemoration of the 1000th anniversary of the Icelandic Parliament. Standing before the Hallgrímskirkja, the Lutheran cathedral in Reykjavík, and facing west toward the Atlantic Ocean and Greenland, the Leif Eriksson Memorial (1929–1932) has become as iconic for Icelanders as the Statue of Liberty is for Americans.

Teacher
Throughout his career, Calder frequently worked as a teacher. He was instructor in modeling at the Pennsylvania Museum School of Industrial Art from 1899 to 1904. He taught at the National Academy of Design's evening school, 1910–11, and alongside Hermon Atkins MacNeil at NAD, 1911–12. He taught modeling at the Art Students League of New York, 1918–22. He was never on PAFA's faculty, but may have occasionally lectured there, where his friend Charles Grafly was instructor in sculpture.

Personal
Calder married portrait painter Nanette Lederer on February 22, 1895, and they lived in Philadelphia for the first decade of their marriage. They had two children: Margaret Calder Hayes (1896–1988) and Alexander "Sandy" Calder III (1899–1976). Calder contracted tuberculosis in 1905, and he and his wife moved to Arizona for a year, leaving the children with friends (to protect them from the disease). Once he recovered his health, the family was reunited in 1906, and settled in Pasadena, California. They moved back east in 1910, and settled in Croton-on-Hudson, New York.

Calder died in 1945. He is buried in West Laurel Hill Cemetery in Bala Cynwyd, Pennsylvania. His memoir, Thoughts of A. Stirling Calder on Art and Life (1947), was published posthumously.

Selected works

Architectural sculpture
 Twelve cast stone figures of Presbyterian clergymen, Witherspoon Building, Philadelphia, Pennsylvania, 1898–99, Joseph Miller Huston, architect.
 Six of the figures were removed in 1961, and relocated to the garden of the Presbyterian Historical Society.

 Six spandrel figures, cast concrete, Throop Polytechnic Institute (now California Institute of Technology), Pasadena, California, 1906–1909, Myron Hart & Elmer Grey, architects.
 Nature and Art, Energy and Law, Science and Imagination
 Oakland Civic Auditorium, Oakland, California, 1914, John J. Donovan, architect.
 The Riches of the Earth – Seven terra cotta, half-domed friezes within the arched entrances.Category:Riches of the Earth (1915) by Alexander Stirling Calder – Wikimedia Commons
 Missouri State Capitol, Jefferson City, Missouri, 1924, Tracy and Swartwout, architects.
 South Frieze, limestone,  x , depicts Missouri history in 13 bas relief panels. The frieze flanks the tops of the central portico's columns and continues behind them.
 North Frieze, limestone, bas relief panels depict Native Americans and Europeans. The frieze flanks the tops of the central columns and continues inside the curved portico.

 Four figures of famous actresses, marble, I. Miller Building, Broadway and West 46th Street, Manhattan, New York City, 1927–1929:

 Sculpture program for University of Pennsylvania Museum of Archaeology and Anthropology, Philadelphia, Pennsylvania, completed 1931, Wilson Eyre, Frank Miles Day, and Cope & Stewardson, architects:
 Lion's Head Fountain (1920s).
 Peacock doorway (1920s).
 Youth doorway (1920s).
 Gateposts (1920s): Asia, Africa, Europe, America

Medallions
 Life as a Dance (1938), Metropolitan Museum of Art, Manhattan, New York City

References
 Armstrong, Craven et al., 200 Years of American Sculpture, Whitney Museum of Art, NYC,  1976
 Bach, Penny Balkin, Public Art in Philadelphia, Temple University Press, Philadelphia, Pennsylvania, 1992
 Calder, A. Sterling, Thoughts of A. Stirling Calder on Art and Life, Privately published, New York,  1947
 Craven, Wayne, Sculpture in America, Thomas Y Crowell Co, New York 1968
 Fairmount Park Art Association, Sculpture of a City: Philadelphia's Treasures in Bronze and Stone, Walker Publishing Co., Inc, New York. NY 1974
 Falk, Peter Hastings, ed.,  Who was Who in American Art, Sound View Press, Madison Connecticut,  1985
 Gadzinski, Cunningham, Panhorst et al., American Sculpture in the Museum of American Art of the Pennsylvania Academy of the Fine Arts, Museum of American Art of the Pennsylvania Academy of the Fine Arts, Philadelphia, Pennsylvania 1997
 Hayes, Margaret Calder, Three Alexander Calders, Paul S Eriksson Publisher, Middlebury, Vermont,  1977
 
 Kvaran and Lockley, A Guide to American Architectural Sculpture unpublished manuscript,
 Opitz, Glenn B ed., Mantle Fielding's Dictionary of American Painters, Sculptors & Engravers, Apollo Book, Poughkeepsie NY, 1986
 Proske, Beatrice Gilman, Brookgreen Gardens Sculpture, Brookgreen Gardens, South Carolina,  1968

Notes

External links

 
 Biography at West Laurel Hill Cemetery web site
 

1870 births
1945 deaths
American architectural sculptors
American male sculptors
19th-century American sculptors
Art Students League of New York faculty
Artists from Philadelphia
American people of Scottish descent
Pennsylvania Academy of the Fine Arts alumni
Students of Thomas Eakins
Pennsylvania Academy of the Fine Arts faculty
American alumni of the École des Beaux-Arts
20th-century American sculptors
20th-century American male artists
American expatriates in France
National Sculpture Society members
Sculptors from Pennsylvania
Sculptors from New York (state)
19th-century American male artists
Burials at West Laurel Hill Cemetery
Members of the American Academy of Arts and Letters